Sabzuyeh (also Romanized as Sabzūyeh; also known as Sowzū and Sūzū) is a village in Horgan Rural District, in the Central District of Neyriz County, Fars Province, Iran. At the 2006 census, its population was 19, in 5 families.

References 

Populated places in Neyriz County